Marius Kipserem (born 17 May 1988) is a Kenyan long-distance runner who specializes in the marathon. He has notably won the Rotterdam Marathon twice in 2016 and 2019. With his second victory, he set a new course record and personal best of 2:04:11. He also won the 2018 Abu Dhabi Marathon and finished second at the 2016 Eindhoven Marathon. He was also a member of the team that helped pace Eliud Kipchoge for the Ineos 1:59 Challenge in 2019.

References

1999 births
Living people
Kenyan male long-distance runners